Filip Krajinović was the defending champion, but he did not participate, as he played at 2015 French Open during that week.

Íñigo Cervantes won the tournament, defeating John Millman in the final.

Seeds

Draw

Finals

Top half

Bottom half

References

External Links
 Main Draw
 Qualifying Draw

Internazionali di Tennis Citta di Vicenza - Singles
2015 Singles
AON